Iocarmic acid (trade name Dimer-X) is a pharmaceutical drug used as an iodinated contrast medium for X-ray imaging in the 1970s and 80s. Uses included imaging of the uterus and Fallopian tubes. It was applied in form of its salt, meglumine iocarmate.

It is not known to be marketed anywhere in the world in 2021.

References 

Radiocontrast agents
Iodoarenes
Benzoic acids
Benzamides
Anilides